Gerwyn Capon (born 9 April 1965) was Dean of Llandaff from 2014 until 2022.

Capon was educated at Liverpool Polytechnic and St Stephen's House, Oxford; and ordained in 2004. After a curacy at St Mary's Church, West Derby, Liverpool, he was Chaplain to the Archbishop of Wales from 2007 to 2009. He was Priest in charge of Holy Trinity, Bolton-le-Sands from 2009 to 2012 and again Archbishop's Chaplain from 2012 until his appointment as Dean. He was installed as Dean on 28 February 2014. He announced his resignation on 17 May 2022, following his withdrawal of the allegation of bullying which he had made against the Bishop of Llandaff, June Osborne.

References

1965 births
Alumni of Liverpool John Moores University
Alumni of St Stephen's House, Oxford
Deans of Llandaff
Living people